Dubnik transmitter is a facility for FM-/TV-broadcasting near Dubnik in Slovakia at 21°27'45" E 48°55'26" N.
It uses as antenna tower a guyed tubular steel mast, which is similar to that of Suchá Hora transmitter and 318 metres tall and one of the tallest towers in Slovakia. Close to the mast, there is an architectonically interesting telecommunication tower.

Radiated programmes

FM

TV

References

External links
 Solideurope.sk
 Radia.sk

Towers in Slovakia
Radio masts and towers in Europe
Transmitter sites in Slovakia